Maribellus luteus is a Gram-negative, facultatively anaerobic and non-motile bacterium from the genus of Maribellus which has been isolated from seawater from the coast of Xiaoshi Island from China.

References

Bacteroidia
Bacteria described in 2019